Illegal Citizens: Queer Lives in the Muslim World is a book by American writer Afdhere Jama. and published in 2008 by Salaam Press.

The book is about the lives of 33 people in 22 countries. Countries whose citizens are profiled include Nigeria, Egypt, Saudi Arabia, Israel, Iran, India, Indonesia, Turkey, Bosnia, and others. Its format is a collection of personal narratives, written in the first person.

References

External links
  "Salaam Press" - the Publisher.

2008 non-fiction books
Biographies about LGBT people
LGBT and Islam
2000s LGBT literature